Marek Czakon (born 1 December 1963 in Opole) is a Polish former football player.

During his career, Czakon played in the premier divisions of Finland and Denmark and in the 2. Bundesliga in Germany. He was the top scorer of Finnish Veikkausliiga in 1990 with 16 goals.

References 

1963 births
Living people
Polish footballers
Odra Opole players
Górnik Zabrze players
FC Ilves players
Polish expatriate footballers
Expatriate footballers in Finland
Expatriate men's footballers in Denmark
Expatriate footballers in Germany
Polish expatriate sportspeople in Finland
Polish expatriate sportspeople in Denmark
Polish expatriate sportspeople in Germany
Veikkausliiga players
2. Bundesliga players
SV Eintracht Trier 05 players
SV Waldhof Mannheim players
1. FC Union Berlin players
Næstved Boldklub players
Boldklubben Frem players
SV Elversberg players
Sportspeople from Opole
Association football forwards
Olimpia Poznań players